The Quatsino Limestone is a geologic formation in British Columbia. It preserves fossils dating back to the Triassic period.

Open Bay 
At Open Bay the limestone of the Quatsino formation has been subjected to strong ductile deformation that likely formed during a regional tectonic event.

References

See also

 List of fossiliferous stratigraphic units in British Columbia
 

Triassic British Columbia